Gordon Harold Jolley (born May 22, 1949 in Provo, Utah) is a former professional American football player who played in 7 NFL seasons from 1971-1977 for the Detroit Lions and the Seattle Seahawks.  He was an inaugural member of the Seattle Seahawks. He was also a prep All-America his senior year (1967) in basketball at Granite High in South Salt Lake, Utah.

Jolley's youngest son, Doug Jolley, played five seasons in the NFL.

Gordon Jolley currently teaches Math at Dixie State College of Utah where he was previously the Offensive Coordinator and Offensive line coach for the football team for 21 years. He was also head coach of the baseball team for 10 years. His baseball teams won the Region 19 championship four years and played in the Junior College World Series twice, in 1989 and 1995. 

In 2008, Jolley was inducted into the Utah Sports Hall of Fame.

Jolley is a member of the Church of Jesus Christ of Latter-day Saints, and has served as a member of a stake high council.

References 

1949 births
Latter Day Saints from Michigan
American football offensive linemen
Detroit Lions players
Utah Tech University faculty
Living people
Sportspeople from Provo, Utah
Seattle Seahawks players
Utah Utes football players
Players of American football from Utah
Latter Day Saints from Utah